Ramazan Civelek (born 22 January 1996) is a Turkish footballer who plays for Kayserispor.

Club career 

Civelek is a youth exponent from Fenerbahçe. He made his cup debut on 2 December 2014 against Kayserispor in a 1–2 away defeat.

References

External links

1996 births
Living people
Turkish footballers
Turkey youth international footballers
Fenerbahçe S.K. footballers
Gaziantep F.K. footballers
Sakaryaspor footballers
Fatih Karagümrük S.K. footballers
Kayserispor footballers
Süper Lig players
TFF First League players
TFF Second League players
Association football midfielders